Happy Akhand (12 October 196028 December 1987) was a Bangladeshi rock singer, songwriter. He was one of the pioneering rock musicians in Bangladesh. He was the founding member of the rock band Miles. He is sometimes referred to as the Prince of Bangladeshi Music. His notable songs include the title "আবার এলো যে সন্ধ্যা (The Evening is Here Again)", "কে বাঁশি বাজায় রে? (Who's Playing the Flute?)" and more. He died on 28 December 1987, at the age of 27 years.

Early life 
Happy Akhand was born on 12 October 1960 in Patla Khan Lane, Dhaka, East Pakistan (now in Bangladesh). He started learning guitar at the age of 10. He started his music career with the help of his elder brother Lucky Akhand. In 1972, he joined the band Spondan as a keyboard player. In 1979, he founded the rock band Miles along with Farid Rashid.

Discography

Solo

Film score

Band (Miles)

Spondan

Filmography

References

External links 

1960 births
1987 deaths
People from Dhaka
20th-century Bangladeshi male singers
20th-century Bangladeshi singers
Place of death missing
Bangladeshi guitarists
20th-century guitarists